Alex Woods (born October 7, 1982) is an American soccer player.

Career

College
Woods played four years of college soccer at Trinity University.

Professional
Undrafted out of college, Woods spent time with the reserve sides of FC Dallas and Houston Dynamo in Major League Soccer. Featuring for both teams in the MLS Reserve Division, but never making a senior appearance for either team.

Woods signed with the Charlotte Eagles in 2007, and made his debut for the team on May 5, 2007, as a second-half substitute in a game against Harrisburg City Islanders. Despite badly breaking his leg halfway through the 2009 season, Woods still managed to play 14 games in 2008, recording one assist, helping the team to the USL Second Division regular season title.

References

External links
 Charlotte Eagles bio

1986 births
Living people
American soccer players
Atlanta Silverbacks players
FC Dallas players
Charleston Battery players
Houston Dynamo FC players
Charlotte Eagles players
USL First Division players
USL Second Division players
Soccer players from Houston
Trinity Tigers men's soccer players
Association football defenders
Association football midfielders